Ben Rothwell (born October 17, 1981) is an American mixed martial artist who competes as a Heavyweight. He most notably had a 17 bout stint in the Ultimate Fighting Championship and competed for the Quad Cities Silverbacks of the IFL where he held an undefeated 9–0 record before leaving the promotion due to a contract dispute. He has also had one-fight stints in Affliction, M-1 Global, and King of the Cage.

Background
Rothwell is from Kenosha, Wisconsin, and both of his parents work in the restaurant business. His parents own a catering company. He is of Norwegian and Irish descent. Rothwell was an active child but suffered a bout with spinal meningitis when he was six years old. He was in a coma and temporarily blind, while the disease made him almost obese. The young Rothwell, who struggled with his weight and identity in his adolescent years, was also troubled growing up and was often involved in fighting and violence at Westosha Central High School. By the time he was a junior in high school, Rothwell knew that he enjoyed fighting, and in 1999, at the age of 17, he began learning self-defense. In July of that same year, after he had been in three professional fights, he and a friend were involved in a car accident with a drunk driver. Rothwell's friend, who was 19 years old, died two weeks later, and Rothwell suffered a significant head injury, in addition to broken ribs. The event changed Rothwell's life, causing him to feel as though he has a purpose to complete.

Mixed martial arts career

Early career
Rothwell began his training in September 1999, before joining Miletich Fighting Systems in 2002.

Rothwell made his professional debut in early 2001 in his home state of Wisconsin and dominated his opponent, winning by TKO only 21 seconds into the fight. He then won his next three fights, all under two minutes into the first round and all with strikes. Rothwell then faced future two-time UFC Heavyweight Champion and fellow Miletich Fighting Systems fighter, Tim Sylvia. Rothwell was handed his first career loss in a decision. However, he bounced back and won his next seven fights, all by submission or TKO, before a unanimous decision loss to Mike Whitehead.

After defeating former King of the Cage Super Heavyweight Champion, Dan Bobish by knockout, Rothwell was soon invited to compete in the International Fight League to fight for the Quad City Silverbacks, coached by the legendary Pat Miletich. Like several other fighters in the promotion, Rothwell was competing for the coach who he trained regularly.

International Fight League
On April 29, 2006, Rothwell made his IFL debut against future UFC veteran, the Polish-Canadian fighter, Krzysztof Soszynski. In the first round, Soszynski surprisingly decided to exchange strikes with Rothwell, and landed a left uppercut and held his own until he was knocked down by a short left hook from Rothwell, who then slammed Soszynski to the canvas. After working from side control and then standing again, Rothwell landed a series of punches at the end of the round, that knocked down Soszynski, and then followed this up with more punches to his downed opponent. Despite the round ending, referee Dan Miragliotta called a stop to the contest, granting Rothwell the win via TKO.

After racking up four consecutive IFL wins, he fought future The Ultimate Fighter: Heavyweights winner and IFL Heavyweight Champion Roy Nelson, winning via split decision.

His next fight was a rematch from almost five years earlier against veteran Travis Fulton, owner of 195 career victories. Three minutes into the second round, Rothwell secured a kimura, causing Fulton to submit.

Rothwell then met Krzysztof Soszynski in a rematch of his IFL debut. Rothwell once again won via TKO, only 13 seconds into the bout.

His last fight in the IFL came against former UFC Heavyweight Champion, Ricco Rodriguez in the team finals. After controlling the fight and displaying superior striking, Rothwell won the fight via unanimous decision. However, the Silverbacks fell short of a victory and lost the championship to Renzo Gracie's New York Pitbulls. This was Rothwell's last appearance in the IFL, as he eventually left the organization due to a contract dispute.

During his time in the IFL, Rothwell had a 9–0 record.

Affliction
After leaving the IFL, Rothwell joined Affliction where he appeared in only one bout, against former UFC Heavyweight Champion Andrei Arlovski, Rothwell lost the fight via knockout due to an uppercut in the final round. This ended Rothwell's 13-fight win streak and gave him his first defeat in over three years.

Ultimate Fighting Championship
Rothwell made his UFC debut on October 24, 2009, at UFC 104 against undefeated Cain Velasquez losing via TKO one minute into round two. The stoppage was controversial because Rothwell seemed to be getting to his feet as Steve Mazzagatti stopped the fight. Rothwell was visibly upset with Mazzagatti's decision to stop the fight. After the fight, UFC president Dana White stated that Mazzagatti was the "worst referee in the history of combat sports".

Rothwell was expected to face Mirko Filipović on February 21, 2010, at UFC 110. However, Rothwell had to withdraw from the event, just days prior, due to an illness and was replaced by Anthony Perosh.

Rothwell then fought Gilbert Yvel on June 15, 2010, at UFC 115 where he won by unanimous decision (30–27, 29–28, and 29–28). Rothwell tore his ACL during his first takedown attempt, which required post-fight surgery. Rothwell also suffered a deviated septum from a head kick during the first round.

After an extended layoff, Rothwell fought Mark Hunt on September 24, 2011, at UFC 135. He lost the fight via unanimous decision.

Rothwell then faced Brendan Schaub on April 21, 2012, at UFC 145. He won the fight via knockout in round one. Rothwell also earned Knockout of the Night honors for his performance.

Rothwell was expected to face Travis Browne at UFC on Fox: Shogun vs. Vera, but pulled out due to an injury

Rothwell faced Gabriel Gonzaga on January 19, 2013, at UFC on FX: Belfort vs. Bisping He lost the fight via submission in the second round.

Rothwell faced Brandon Vera at UFC 164 on August 31, 2013. He won the fight via TKO by punches in round three. Subsequent to the bout, Rothwell tested positive for elevated testosterone levels. The UFC suspended Rothwell for nine months, despite the Wisconsin commission only issuing him with an administrative warning.

Rothwell was briefly linked to a bout with Ruslan Magomedov for on August 30, 2014, at UFC 177. However, on July 9, the UFC announced he would face Alistair Overeem on September 5, 2014, at UFC Fight Night 50. Rothwell won the fight via TKO in the first round. The win also earned Rothwell his first Performance of the Night bonus award.

Rothwell faced Matt Mitrione on June 6, 2015, at UFC Fight Night 68. He won the fight via submission in the first round, the first submission win of his UFC career.

Rothwell was expected to face Stipe Miocic on October 24, 2015, at UFC Fight Night 76. However, Miocic pulled out of the fight on October 13 citing injury. Subsequently, Rothwell was removed from the card the following day after the promotion deemed that a suitable opponent could not be arranged on short notice.

Rothwell next faced Josh Barnett on January 30, 2016, at UFC on Fox 18. He won the fight in the second round due to a guillotine choke, making Rothwell the only fighter to ever stop Barnett with a submission hold during Barnett's lengthy MMA career. The win also earned Rothwell his second Performance of the Night bonus award.

Rothwell faced Junior dos Santos on April 10, 2016, at UFC Fight Night 86. He lost the fight via unanimous decision.

Rothwell was expected to face Fabrício Werdum on September 10, 2016, at UFC 203. However, Rothwell pulled out of the fight on August 11 citing a knee injury and was replaced by Travis Browne.

The bout with Werdum was rescheduled and expected to take place on May 13, 2017, at UFC 211. However, the bout was canceled due to Rothwell failing a drug test. On April 6, 2018, it was announced Rothwell had accepted a two-year suspension from USADA, retroactive to February 6, 2017.

Having served his suspension, Rothwell returned to face Blagoy Ivanov on March 9, 2019, at UFC Fight Night 146. He lost the fight by unanimous decision.

A rematch with Andrei Arlovski took place on July 20, 2019, at UFC on ESPN 4. He lost the fight via unanimous decision.

Rothwell faced Stefan Struve on December 7, 2019, at UFC on ESPN 7. He won the fight via technical knockout in round two. The finish was controversial as Rothwell had accidentally hit Struve in the groin twice and was docked one point for these infractions in the second round. The referee encouraged the compromised Struve to continue, resulting in a finish for Rothwell late in the second round.

Rothwell was scheduled to face Gian Villante on April 18, 2020, at UFC 249. However, the event and Rothwell's scheduled bout against Villante was cancelled due to the COVID-19 pandemic.

Rothwell faced Ovince Saint Preux at UFC Fight Night: Smith vs. Teixeira on May 13, 2020. He won the fight via split decision.

Rothwell faced Marcin Tybura on  October 11, 2020 at UFC Fight Night 179. He lost the fight via unanimous decision.

Rothwell was scheduled to face Philipe Lins on March 13, 2021, at UFC Fight Night 187. However, during the week leading up to the event the bout was removed from the card due to undisclosed reasons. The pairing remained intact and  the bout was rescheduled on May 8, 2021, at UFC on ESPN 24. While Rothwell made weight without issue, Lins never showed up to the weigh-ins and withdrew from the bout due to an illness. The bout was rescheduled again for May 22, 2021 at UFC Fight Night: Font vs. Garbrandt. However, yet again, Lins was pulled from the event for undisclosed reason and he was replaced by newcomer Askhar Mozharov. Just hours later, the Ukrainian announced he would not be able to get a visa in time for the event, and he was replaced by Chris Barnett. He won the fight via guillotine choke submission in the second round.

Rothwell faced Marcos Rogério de Lima on November 13, 2021, at UFC Fight Night 197. After Rothwell was stunned multiple times on the feet, referee Herb Dean stepped in to stop the fight, though he allowed Rothwell to attempt a takedown before officially calling off the fight as a TKO win for Lima.

Rothwell was scheduled to face Alexander Gustafsson on May 21, 2022 at UFC Fight Night 206. However, at the end of March, it was announced that Rothwell asked for his release and it was granted from the UFC.

Bare Knuckle Fighting Championship 

On April 25, 2022 it was announced that Rothwell joined Bare Knuckle Fighting Championship.

Personal life
Rothwell attended Waukesha County Technical College where he earned a technical degree in collision repair. Aside from working in his parents' restaurant, he worked in a body shop and as a labor union construction worker in Chicago, Illinois.

Rothwell is married and has a daughter, and a son Odin (born 2021). Currently, Rothwell and his wife own Rothwell Mixed Martial Arts in Kenosha, Wisconsin. Rothwell MMA, established in 2011, teaches MMA, kickboxing, boxing, Muay Thai, Brazilian jiu-jitsu, wrestling, self-defense, yoga, and fitness to children and adults of all ages and experience levels. Rothwell is also the head coach for an MMA competition team of 30 amateur and professional MMA fighters. They often compete as a team at Wisconsin Xtreme Cage Fighting (WXCF) events at Racine Memorial Hall.

Championships and accomplishments

Mixed martial arts
Ultimate Fighting Championship
Knockout of the Night (One time) vs. Brendan Schaub
Performance of the Night (Two times) vs. Alistair Overeem, Josh Barnett
United States Mixed Martial Arts
USMMA Heavyweight Championship (One time; first)
MMADNA.nl
2016 Submission of the Year

Mixed martial arts record

|-
|Loss
|align=center|39–14
|Marcos Rogério de Lima
|TKO (punches)
|UFC Fight Night: Holloway vs. Rodríguez
|
|align=center|1
|align=center|0:32
|Las Vegas, Nevada, United States
|
|-
|Win
|align=center|39–13
|Chris Barnett
|Submission (guillotine choke)
|UFC Fight Night: Font vs. Garbrandt 
|
|align=center|2
|align=center|2:07
|Las Vegas, Nevada, United States
|
|-
|Loss
|align=center|38–13
|Marcin Tybura
|Decision (unanimous)
|UFC Fight Night: Moraes vs. Sandhagen
|
|align=center|3
|align=center|5:00
|Abu Dhabi, United Arab Emirates
|
|-
|Win
|align=center|38–12
|Ovince Saint Preux
|Decision (split)
|UFC Fight Night: Smith vs. Teixeira
|
|align=center|3
|align=center|5:00
|Jacksonville, Florida, United States
|
|-
|Win
|align=center|37–12
|Stefan Struve
|TKO (punches)
|UFC on ESPN: Overeem vs. Rozenstruik 
|
|align=center|2
|align=center|4:57
|Washington, D.C., United States
|
|-
|Loss
|align=center|36–12
|Andrei Arlovski
|Decision (unanimous)
|UFC on ESPN: dos Anjos vs. Edwards 
|
|align=center|3
|align=center|5:00
|San Antonio, Texas, United States
|
|-
|Loss
|align=center|36–11
|Blagoy Ivanov
|Decision (unanimous)
|UFC Fight Night: Lewis vs. dos Santos
|
|align=center|3
|align=center|5:00
|Wichita, Kansas, United States
|
|-
|Loss
|style="text-align:center;"|36–10
|Junior dos Santos
|Decision (unanimous)
|UFC Fight Night: Rothwell vs. dos Santos
|
|style="text-align:center;"|5
|style="text-align:center;"|5:00
|Zagreb, Croatia
|
|-
|Win
|style="text-align:center;"|36–9
|Josh Barnett
|Submission (guillotine choke)
|UFC on Fox: Johnson vs. Bader
|
|style="text-align:center;"|2
|style="text-align:center;"|3:48
|Newark, New Jersey, United States
|
|-
|Win
|style="text-align:center;"|35–9
|Matt Mitrione
|Submission (guillotine choke)
|UFC Fight Night: Boetsch vs. Henderson
|
|style="text-align:center;"|1
|style="text-align:center;"|1:54
|New Orleans, Louisiana, United States
|
|-
|Win
|style="text-align:center;"|34–9
|Alistair Overeem
|TKO (punches)
|UFC Fight Night: Jacare vs. Mousasi
|
|style="text-align:center;"|1
|style="text-align:center;"|2:19
|Mashantucket, Connecticut, United States
|
|-
|Win
|style="text-align:center;"|33–9
|Brandon Vera
|TKO (punches)
|UFC 164
|
|style="text-align:center;"|3
|style="text-align:center;"|1:54
|Milwaukee, Wisconsin, United States
|
|-
|Loss
|style="text-align:center;"|32–9
|Gabriel Gonzaga
|Submission (guillotine choke)
|UFC on FX: Belfort vs. Bisping
|
|style="text-align:center;"|2
|style="text-align:center;"|1:01
|São Paulo, Brazil
|
|-
|Win
|style="text-align:center;"|32–8
|Brendan Schaub
|KO (punches)
|UFC 145
|
|style="text-align:center;"|1
|style="text-align:center;"|1:10
|Atlanta, Georgia, United States
|
|-
|Loss
|style="text-align:center;"|31–8
|Mark Hunt
|Decision (unanimous)
|UFC 135
|
|style="text-align:center;"|3
|style="text-align:center;"|5:00
|Denver, Colorado, United States
|
|-
|Win
|style="text-align:center;"|31–7
|Gilbert Yvel
|Decision (unanimous)
|UFC 115
|
|style="text-align:center;"|3
|style="text-align:center;"|5:00
|Vancouver, British Columbia, Canada
|
|-
|Loss
|style="text-align:center;"|30–7
|Cain Velasquez
|TKO (punches)
|UFC 104
|
|style="text-align:center;"|2
|style="text-align:center;"|0:58
|Los Angeles, California, United States
|
|-
|Win
|style="text-align:center;"|30–6
|Chris Guillen
|TKO (submission to elbows)
|Adrenaline MMA 2: Miletich vs. Denny
|
|style="text-align:center;"|1
|style="text-align:center;"|3:30
|Moline, Illinois, United States
|
|-
|Loss
|style="text-align:center;"|29–6
|Andrei Arlovski
|KO (punches)
|Affliction: Banned
|
|style="text-align:center;"|3
|style="text-align:center;"|1:13
|Anaheim, California, United States
|
|-
|Win
|style="text-align:center;"|29–5
|Ricco Rodriguez
|Decision (unanimous)
|IFL: 2007 Team Championship final
|
|style="text-align:center;"|3
|style="text-align:center;"|4:00
|Hollywood, Florida, United States
|
|-
|Win
|style="text-align:center;"|28–5
|Krzysztof Soszyński
|TKO (punches)
|IFL: 2007 semifinals
|
|style="text-align:center;"|1
|style="text-align:center;"|0:13
|East Rutherford, New Jersey, United States
|
|-
|Win
|style="text-align:center;"|27–5
|Travis Fulton
|Submission (kimura)
|IFL: Chicago
|
|style="text-align:center;"|2
|style="text-align:center;"|3:11
|Chicago, Illinois, United States
|
|-
|Win
|style="text-align:center;"|26–5
|Roy Nelson
|Decision (split)
|IFL: Moline
|
|style="text-align:center;"|3
|style="text-align:center;"|4:00
|Moline, Illinois, United States
|
|-
|Win
|style="text-align:center;"|25–5
|Matt Thompson
|TKO (punches)
|IFL: Houston
|
|style="text-align:center;"|2
|style="text-align:center;"|1:47
|Houston, Texas, United States
|
|-
|Win
|style="text-align:center;"|24–5
|Devin Cole
|KO (head kick)
|IFL: Championship final
|
|style="text-align:center;"|1
|style="text-align:center;"|3:16
|Uncasville, Connecticut, United States
|
|-
|Win
|style="text-align:center;"|23–5
|Wojtek Kaszowski
|Submission (americana)
|IFL: World Championship semifinals
|
|style="text-align:center;"|1
|style="text-align:center;"|3:14
|Portland, Oregon, United States
|
|-
|Win
|style="text-align:center;"|22–5
|Bryan Vetell
|KO (punch)
|IFL: Gracie vs. Miletich
|
|style="text-align:center;"|1
|style="text-align:center;"|3:17
|Moline, Illinois, United States
|
|-
|Win
|style="text-align:center;"|21–5
|Krzysztof Soszyński
|TKO (punches)
|IFL: Legends Championship 2006
|
|style="text-align:center;"|1
|style="text-align:center;"|3:59
|Atlantic City, New Jersey, United States
|
|-
|Win
|style="text-align:center;"|20–5
|Dan Bobish
|KO (knee)
|GFC: Team Gracie vs Team Hammer House
|
|style="text-align:center;"|1
|style="text-align:center;"|4:20
|Columbus, Ohio, United States
|
|-
|Win
|style="text-align:center;"|19–5
|Joey Smith
|TKO (submission to punches)
|ISCF: Gladiators X
|
|style="text-align:center;"|1
|style="text-align:center;"|N/A
|Milwaukee, Wisconsin, United States
|
|-
|Win
|style="text-align:center;"|18–5
|Don Richard
|TKO (punches)
|KOTC: Conquest
|
|style="text-align:center;"|1
|style="text-align:center;"|3:32
|Calgary, Alberta, Canada
|
|-
|Win
|style="text-align:center;"|17–5
|Allan Weickert
|TKO (punches)
|GFS: Fight Nite in the Flats
|
|style="text-align:center;"|1
|style="text-align:center;"|3:45
|Cleveland, Ohio, United States
|
|-
|Loss
|style="text-align:center;"|16–5
|Dan Christison
|Submission (kimura)
|Euphoria: USA vs World
|
|style="text-align:center;"|3
|style="text-align:center;"|0:57
|Atlantic City, New Jersey, United States
|
|-
|Win
|style="text-align:center;"|16–4
|Jonathan Wiezorek
|TKO (punches)
|Euphoria: Road to the Titles
|
|style="text-align:center;"|1
|style="text-align:center;"|1:09
|Atlantic City, New Jersey, United States
|
|-
|Win
|style="text-align:center;"|15–4
|Matt Bear
|TKO (submission to punches)
|Ultimate Throwdown
|
|style="text-align:center;"|1
|style="text-align:center;"|2:57
|Des Moines, Iowa, United States
|
|-
|Loss
|style="text-align:center;"|14–4
|Carlos Barreto
|KO (head kick)
|Heat FC 1: Genesis
|
|style="text-align:center;"|1
|style="text-align:center;"|N/A
|Natal, Brazil
|
|-
|Win
|style="text-align:center;"|14–3
|Royce Louck
|TKO (doctor stoppage)
|Freestyle Combat Challenge 11
|
|style="text-align:center;"|1
|style="text-align:center;"|N/A
|Racine, Wisconsin, United States
|
|-
|Loss
|style="text-align:center;"|13–3
|Ibragim Magomedov
|TKO (retirement)
|M-1 MFC: Russia vs. the World 4
|
|style="text-align:center;"|1
|style="text-align:center;"|10:00
|St. Petersburg, Russia
|
|-
|Win
|style="text-align:center;"|13–2
|Travis Fulton
|TKO (injury)
|Freestyle Combat Challenge 8
|
|style="text-align:center;"|1
|style="text-align:center;"|5:00
|Racine, Wisconsin, United States
|
|-
|Win
|style="text-align:center;"|12–2
|Johnathan Ivey
|TKO (doctor stoppage)
|USMMA 2: Ring of Fury
|
|style="text-align:center;"|1
|style="text-align:center;"|1:14
|Lowell, Massachusetts, United States
|
|-
|Loss
|style="text-align:center;"|11–2
|Mike Whitehead
|Decision (unanimous)
|rowspan=2 |SB 24: Return of the Heavyweights 2
|rowspan=2 |
|style="text-align:center;"|2
|style="text-align:center;"|5:00
|rowspan=2 |Honolulu, Hawaii, United States
|
|-
|Win
|style="text-align:center;"|11–1
|Kerry Schall
|TKO (neck injury)
|style="text-align:center;"|2
|style="text-align:center;"|2:10
|
|-
|Win
|style="text-align:center;"|10–1
|Curtis Crawford
|Submission (forearm choke)
|SB 24: Return of the Heavyweights 1
|
|style="text-align:center;"|1
|style="text-align:center;"|1:03
|Honolulu, Hawaii, United States
|
|-
|Win
|style="text-align:center;"|9–1
|Mike Priest
|TKO (injury)
|Freestyle Combat Challenge 7
|
|style="text-align:center;"|1
|style="text-align:center;"|N/A
|Racine, Wisconsin, United States
|
|-
|Win
|style="text-align:center;"|8–1
|Mike Radnov
|TKO (doctor stoppage)
|rowspan=2 |Extreme Challenge 46
|rowspan=2 |
|style="text-align:center;"|1
|style="text-align:center;"|5:54
|rowspan=2 |Clive, Iowa, United States
|
|-
|Win
|style="text-align:center;"|7–1
|Kerry Schall
|TKO (foot injury)
|style="text-align:center;"|1
|style="text-align:center;"|7:29
|
|-
|Win
|style="text-align:center;"|6–1
|Mike Marshalleck
|TKO (punches)
|Freestyle Combat Challenge 6
|
|style="text-align:center;"|1
|style="text-align:center;"|0:38
|Racine, Wisconsin, United States
|
|-
|Win
|style="text-align:center;"|5–1
|Steve Hutson
|Submission (arm-triangle choke)
|SC 8: Fight Night
|
|style="text-align:center;"|1
|style="text-align:center;"|3:35
|LaSalle, Illinois, United States
|
|-
|Loss
|style="text-align:center;"|4–1
|Tim Sylvia
|Decision (unanimous)
|Extreme Challenge 42
|
|style="text-align:center;"|3
|style="text-align:center;"|5:00
|Davenport, Iowa, United States
|
|-
|Win
|style="text-align:center;"|4–0
|Billy Herrington
|TKO (submission to knees)
|Iowa Challenge 2
|
|style="text-align:center;"|1
|style="text-align:center;"|1:07
|Cedar Rapids, Iowa, United States
|
|-
|Win
|style="text-align:center;"|3–0
|Darren Block
|KO (punch)
|rowspan=2 |Dangerzone: Auburn
|rowspan=2 |
|style="text-align:center;"|1
|style="text-align:center;"|0:16
|rowspan=2 |Auburn, Indiana, United States
|
|-
|Win
|style="text-align:center;"|2–0
|Anthony Ferguson
|TKO (referee stoppage)
|style="text-align:center;"|1
|style="text-align:center;"|1:00
|
|-
|Win
|style="text-align:center;"|1–0
|Rob Shinkle
|TKO (corner stoppage)
|Freestyle Combat Challenge 3
|
|style="text-align:center;"|1
|style="text-align:center;"|0:21
|Racine, Wisconsin, United States
|
|-

Kickboxing record (Incomplete)

|-  bgcolor="#CCFFCC"
| 2005-10-21 || Win ||align=left| Justice Smith || ISCF: Colosseum Returns || Milwaukee, Wisconsin, USA || DQ (low blows) || 1 || N/A
|-
|-  bgcolor="#CCFFCC"
| 2005-01-23 || Win ||align=left| Nobu Hayashi || Shootboxing 2005: Ground Zero Fukuoka || Fukuoka, Japan || Decision (unanimous) || 3 || 3:00
|-
| colspan=8 | Legend:

Bare knuckle boxing record

|-
|Win
|align=center|1–0
|Bobo O'Bannon
|KO (punch)
|BKFC 30
|
|align=center|1
|align=center|0:19
|Monroe, Louisiana, United States
|

See also
List of male mixed martial artists

References

External links

Living people
1981 births
American people of Irish descent
American people of Norwegian descent
American male mixed martial artists
Mixed martial artists from Wisconsin
Heavyweight mixed martial artists
Mixed martial artists utilizing shootboxing
Mixed martial artists utilizing Brazilian jiu-jitsu
American male kickboxers
Kickboxers from Wisconsin
American practitioners of Brazilian jiu-jitsu
Heavyweight kickboxers
Sportspeople from Kenosha, Wisconsin
Waukesha County Technical College alumni
Doping cases in mixed martial arts
Ultimate Fighting Championship male fighters